Huaquillas (Spanish: /wa.'ki.ʝas/) is a border town in western El Oro, Ecuador. It is the canton seat of the Huaquillas Canton.

Huaquillas is located on the border with Peru. An international bridge that goes over the Zarumilla River connects it with the Peruvian town of Aguas Verdes. Both towns have an intense commercial life and many formal, as well as informal street sellers that sell goods both in US dollars, the only currency in Ecuador, and in Peruvian soles.

The town was occupied by Peru during the 1941 Ecuadorian–Peruvian War.

External links

Ecuador Traveler and Expat Forum with info on Huaquillas
 Puente Internacional Zarumilla, border crossing between Huaquillas and Aguas Verdes.

Populated places in El Oro Province
Ecuador–Peru border crossings